Egon Orowan FRS (August 2, 1902 – August 3, 1989) was a Hungarian-British physicist and metallurgist. According to György Marx, he was one of The Martians.

Life
Orowan was born in the Óbuda district of Budapest. His father, Berthold (d. 1933), was a mechanical engineer and factory manager, and his mother, Josze (Josephine) Spitzer Ságvári, was the daughter of an impoverished land owner.

In 1920 he went to the University of Vienna, where he studied chemistry for one year and astronomy for another. After six months of mandatory apprenticeship done home in Hungary, he was admitted to the Technical University of Berlin, where he studied mechanical and then electrical engineering. Eventually he started his own experiments in physics, where he was adopted as a student by Professor Richard Becker in 1928. In 1932 he completed his doctorate on the fracture of mica.

Soon after Hitler's rise to power in 1933, Orowan, who was of partially Jewish descent, left for Hungary, where in 1934 he wrote the famous paper on dislocations. He had been doing the experiments, while still in Berlin, which supported the theory put forward in Becker's 1925 paper. In 1934, Orowan, roughly contemporarily with G. I. Taylor and Michael Polanyi, realized that the plastic deformation of ductile materials could be explained in terms of the theory of dislocations developed by Vito Volterra in 1905. Though the discovery was neglected until after World War II, it was critical in developing the modern science of solid mechanics.

In Hungary, he seemed to have experienced some difficulty in finding immediate employment and spent the next few years living with his mother and ruminating on his doctoral research. From 1936-1939, he worked for the Tungsram light bulbs manufacturer, where, with the help of Mihály (Michael) Polanyi, he developed a new process for the extraction of krypton from the air.

In 1937, aware of the imminence of war, Orowan accepted the invitation of Rudolf Peierls and moved to the University of Birmingham, UK where they worked together on the theory of fatigue.

In 1939 he moved to the University of Cambridge, where William Lawrence Bragg inspired his interest in x-ray diffraction. During World War II, he worked on problems of munitions production, particularly that of plastic flow during rolling. In 1944, he was central to the reappraisal of the causes of the loss of many Liberty ships during the war, identifying the critical issues of the notch sensitivity of poor quality welds and the aggravating effects of the extreme low temperatures of the North Atlantic.

In 1950, he moved to the Massachusetts Institute of Technology where, in addition to continuing his metallurgical work, he developed his interests in geological and glacialogical fracture.

In the latter study, Orowan developed the writings of the 14th century Tunisian historian Ibn Khaldun to forecast a supposed eventual failure of market demand similar to that claimed by Karl Marx. His ideas found little acceptance among the majority of economists.

Throughout his life, he patented many inventions.

Honours
Fellow of the Royal Society, (1947)
Member of the American Academy of Arts and Sciences, (1951)
Member of the National Academy of Sciences, (1969);
Bingham Medal of the American Society of Rheology, (1959);
Gauss Medal of the Braunschweiger Wissenschaftliche Gesellschaft, (1968);
Vincent Bendix Gold Medal of the American Society for Engineering Education, (1971);
Paul Bergse Medal of the Danish Metallurgical Society, (1973);
The Acta Metallurgica Gold Medal, (1985).

See also
The Martians (scientists)

References

External links
 Egon Orowan. 1901—1989. A Biographical Memoir by F.R.N. Nabarro and A. S. Argon. 1996. National Academies Press. Washington D.C.
 Interview with Dr. Egon Orowan in 1981. Dr. Orowan speaks about his professional life. Transcript of interview tapes.
 Kovács László. Orován Egon szilárdtestfizikus születésének centenáriumán. Magyar Tudomány, 2002/3 372.
Egon Orowan Papers, MC 306. Massachusetts Institute of Technology, Institute Archives and Special Collections, Cambridge, Massachusetts.

1902 births
Members of the United States National Academy of Sciences
1989 deaths
20th-century Hungarian physicists
20th-century British physicists
20th-century Hungarian inventors
20th-century British inventors
Hungarian metallurgists
Rheologists
Academics of the University of Birmingham
Fellows of the Royal Society
Hungarian emigrants to the United States
Naturalised citizens of the United Kingdom
Technical University of Berlin alumni
Jews who immigrated to the United Kingdom to escape Nazism
Jewish physicists